German chocolate cake, originally German's chocolate cake, is a layered chocolate cake filled and topped with a coconut-pecan frosting. Originating in the United States, it owes its name to an English-American chocolate maker named Samuel German, who developed a formulation of dark baking chocolate that came to be used in the cake recipe. It is not German by nationality. Sweet baking chocolate is traditionally used for the cake's flavor, but few recipes call for it today. The filling and/or topping is a custard made with egg yolks and evaporated milk; once the custard is cooked, coconut and pecans are stirred in. Occasionally, a chocolate frosting is spread on the sides of the cake and piped around the circumference of the layers to hold in the filling. Maraschino cherries are occasionally added as a garnish.

History
Its roots can be traced back to 1852 when American baker Samuel German developed a type of dark baking chocolate for the Baker's Chocolate Company. The brand name of the product, Baker's German's Sweet Chocolate, was named in his honor.

On June 3, 1957, a recipe for "German's Chocolate Cake" appeared as the "Recipe of the Day" in The Dallas Morning News. It was created by Mrs. George Clay, a homemaker from 3831 Academy Drive, Dallas, Texas.  This recipe used the baking chocolate introduced 105 years prior and became quite popular. General Foods, which owned the Baker's brand at the time, took notice and distributed the cake recipe to other newspapers in the country. Sales of Baker's Chocolate are said to have increased by as much as 73% and the cake would become a national staple. The possessive form (German's) was dropped in subsequent publications, forming the "German Chocolate Cake" identity and giving the false impression of a German origin. However, there are original recipes for chocolate cakes from Germany. e.g. there is a traditional recipe that won a local competition for a chocolate cake with cherries that dates back to 1909 in the Lake Constance area. This is a favorite German chocolate cake classic that is served throughout Southern Germany, Austria and Switzerland.

See also
Black Forest cake, or Schwarzwälder Kirschtorte, a chocolate- and cherry-flavored cake that is of German origin
Chantilly cake, a chocolate cake similar to German chocolate cake
Texas sheet cake
List of desserts

Further reading

References

Chocolate desserts
Cuisine of the Southern United States
American cakes
Layer cakes
Custard desserts
Chocolate cakes